Ignacio José Irañeta (born 24 February 1987) is an Argentine professional footballer who plays as a forward.

Career
Irañeta's senior career started in 2006 with Gimnasia y Esgrima, appearing two times in the 2006–07 Torneo Argentino A. 2009 saw Argentino sign Irañeta. Subsequent stints with Centro Deportivo Rivadavia, San Martín, Deportivo Guaymallén and Leonardo Murialdo followed between 2010 and 2014; with the forward making over thirty appearances for those teams across Torneo Argentino B, Torneo Federal B and Torneo Argentino C. On 30 June 2014, Irañeta joined Gutiérrez of the fourth tier. One goal in ten fixtures arrived in the 2014 campaign for the club, which ended with promotion via the third stage play-offs.

In January 2016, Irañeta completed a move to Independiente Rivadavia of Primera B Nacional. He made his professional league debut during a goalless draw with Villa Dálmine on 31 January, which was his only match in 2016. Thirty-one appearances followed in the next two seasons, with Irañeta netting his opening pro goals in the process against Estudiantes, Nueva Chicago and Quilmes.

Personal life
In January 2019, Irañeta was charged with the alleged sexual abuse of his three-year-old niece after he abstained from testifying. After being a fugitive for almost a month, Irañeta appeared in court before being released on bail until final sentencing. However, Irañeta claimed his innocence in March. It was also revealed he offered to terminate his Independiente Rivadavia contract, though the club denied his request. He returned to action for the first time since the accusation, featuring in a league fixture with Guillermo Brown on 7 April.

Career statistics
.

References

External links

1987 births
Living people
Sportspeople from Mendoza, Argentina
Argentine footballers
Association football forwards
Torneo Argentino A players
Torneo Argentino B players
Torneo Argentino C players
Torneo Federal A players
Primera Nacional players
Gimnasia y Esgrima de Mendoza footballers
Argentino de Mendoza players
San Martín de Mendoza footballers
Deportivo Guaymallén players
Independiente Rivadavia footballers
Association football controversies